Robin Bacchus (born 27 April 1989) is a Guyanese cricketer. He played his only List A cricket match for Guyana national cricket team in the Nagico Super50 2013–2014 on 8 February 2014.

References

External links
 

1989 births
Living people
Guyanese cricketers
Guyana cricketers